Richard Dale Nichols (April 29, 1926 – March 7, 2019) was an American banker and politician who served one-term as the U.S. representative from Kansas's 5th congressional district.

Life and career
Born in Fort Scott, Kansas, Nichols attended the public schools. He earned his B.S. from Kansas State University in 1951, after serving as an ensign in the United States Navy from 1944 to 1947.

Nichols was informational counsel to the Kansas State Board of Agriculture, served as associate farm director of radio and television stations in Topeka, Kansas, and was agricultural representative of a bank in Hutchinson, Kansas. From 1969 until he resigned in 1990 after being elected to Congress, Nichols served as president and chairman of the board of Home State Bank in McPherson, Kansas.

He served as a member of the Kansas State Republican Executive Committee, was a delegate to the 1988 Republican National Convention, and was the Republican Party chair for the Fifth Congressional District from 1986 to 1990.

In July 1986, Nichols and his wife were stabbed by an insane man aboard the Staten Island Ferry while a touring New York City. He fully recovered from his wounds and was visited by Mayor Ed Koch in the hospital.

Nichols was elected as a Republican to the One Hundred Second Congress (January 3, 1991 – January 3, 1993), representing Kansas's 5th congressional district. He narrowly beat future FDIC Chairwoman Sheila Bair in a 6-way Republican primary. In the reapportionment following the 1990 Census, the size of Kansas' congressional delegation was reduced from 5 to 4, eliminating the 5th district. In 1992, Rep. Nichols ran for the Republican nomination to challenge Dan Glickman in the 4th congressional district, but lost in the primary to state Senator Eric R. Yost, who lost to Glickman in the general election.

Personal life
Nichols married Connie Weinbrenner in 1951, and together had three children. Connie earned four degrees and was a professor at McPherson College before her death from cancer in 1994. Two years later, Nichols married his second wife, Linda.

Dick Nichols died at his home in McPherson, Kansas, on March 7, 2019, at the age of 92.

References

External links

 

1926 births
2019 deaths
American bankers
People from Fort Scott, Kansas
People from McPherson, Kansas
Businesspeople from Kansas
Military personnel from Kansas
United States Navy personnel of World War II
United States Navy officers
Kansas State University alumni
Republican Party members of the United States House of Representatives from Kansas
20th-century American businesspeople